Dichomeris crossospila is a moth in the family Gelechiidae. It was described by Edward Meyrick in 1933. It is found in Costa Rica.

References

Moths described in 1933
crossospila